Team Russia was the name of the Russian backed entry in the 2008–09 Volvo Ocean Race. Team Russia was founded by Oleg Zherebtsov, the founder of the Lenta hypermarket chain in Russia. Zherebstov met former Olympic sailor and professional skipper, Andreas Hanakamp, by chance during a sailing holiday in Croatia.
The CEO of Team Russia is Michael Woods, who was director of Race Operations for the 2001-02 race.

Their yacht, a second generation Volvo Open 70, was designed by British designer Rob Humphreys and built by Green Marine in Lymington, UK she was christened Kosatka (which is Russian for orca or killer whale) at a ceremony at Gunwharf Quays Marina, Portsmouth, UK on Monday June 16, 2008, by the boats godmother Birgitta Westerberg, co-founder (with Oleg Zherebtsov), of the Solntse (Sun) Foundation charity for sick and underprivileged children in St Petersburg, Russia.

Team Russia had to suspend racing upon arrival in Singapore at the end of Leg 3 due to "insufficient funds". They officially withdrew from legs 4, 5, and 6 of the race, and whilst the team hoped to rejoin for the last legs of the race, this was not possible, however the team did sail Leg 10 beside the rest of the fleet to their hometown of St Petersberg.

Race team

The race team consisted of some previous Volvo Ocean Race sailors, as well as some newcomers to the event.

WDCS Partnership
The WDCS were announced as the official partner for Team Russia.
Kosatka sailed under the logo 'We Sail For The Whale’ which calls for the creation of twelve new marine protected areas for whales and dolphins by 2012.
For more information see: WDCS#2008–09 Volvo Ocean Race

References

External links
Team Russia
Volvo Ocean Race 
WDCS: We Sail For The Whale
WDCS Homepage

Volvo Ocean Race teams
Volvo Ocean Race